Allison Lee Scurich (born 7 June 1986) is a retired American born Croatian football defender.

She chose to represent Croatia at international competitions. In October 2011 she played her first game for the Croatian national team, a 0–3 loss against Netherlands in the 2013 European Championship qualification.

References

1986 births
Living people
American women's soccer players
Croatian women's footballers
Expatriate women's footballers in Germany
Sportspeople from Mission Viejo, California
Washington State Cougars women's soccer players
American people of Croatian descent
Soccer players from California
Los Angeles Sol players
Women's association football defenders
Croatia women's international footballers
21st-century American women
American expatriate women's soccer players
Croatian expatriate women's footballers
American expatriate soccer players in Germany
Croatian expatriate sportspeople in Germany